General Bartolomé Salom Airport  is an airport serving Puerto Cabello, a city in the Carabobo state of Venezuela.

Airlines and destinations

See also
Transport in Venezuela
List of airports in Venezuela

References

External links
OurAirports - Puerto Cabello
SkyVector - Puerto Cabello

Airports in Venezuela